Sun Xiaolei (born 1986-01-12 in Zhejiang) is a Chinese swimmer, who competed for Team China at the 2008 Summer Olympics.

Major achievements
2007 National Championships - 1st 50m back

References
http://2008teamchina.olympic.cn/index.php/personview/personsen/5527

1986 births
Living people
Chinese male backstroke swimmers
Olympic swimmers of China
Swimmers from Shanghai
Swimmers at the 2008 Summer Olympics
Medalists at the FINA World Swimming Championships (25 m)
Asian Games medalists in swimming
Swimmers at the 2010 Asian Games
Swimmers at the 2014 Asian Games
Medalists at the 2010 Asian Games
Asian Games bronze medalists for China
21st-century Chinese people